Rattanaburi is a district (amphoe) in the northeastern part of Surin province, northeastern Thailand.

History
Rattanaburi was a mueang under Mueang Surin, which was converted into a district in the Thesaphiban administrative reforms at the end of the 19th century.

Geography
Neighboring districts are (from the south clockwise): Non Narai, Sanom and Tha Tum of Surin Province; Suwannaphum and Phon Sai of Roi Et province; and Rasi Salai, Bueng Bun, Pho Si Suwan and Mueang Chan of Sisaket province.

Administration
The district is divided into 12 sub-districts (tambons), which are further subdivided into 163 villages (mubans). Rattanaburi is a township (thesaban tambon) which covers parts of tambons Rattanaburi and Phai. There are a further 12 tambon administrative organizations (TAO).

Missing numbers are tambon which now form Non Narai District.

Rattanaburi